Greatest Hits Volume 1 is a greatest hits compilation released in January 2012 by Swedish rock band Mando Diao. The album features select tracks from their first six studio albums. There is one previously unreleased song on the compilation: Christmas Could Have Been Good, which was released digitally on 2 December 2011.

The Bonus DVD also features (part of) a live gig from the 2006 Ode to Ochrasy Tour at Zenith in Munich, as well as 18 of their 22 music videos (omitting those to "Gloria", "Mean Street", "Nothing Without You" & "Down In The Past – MTV unplugged") to date.

Track listing

Bonus DVD: Live at Zenith, Munich – Ode to Ochrasy Tour 2006

The Videos

Chart performance

Charts

Album

Singles

References

2012 compilation albums
Mando Diao albums
Swedish-language compilation albums